Medyntsevo is a rural locality (a village) in Novoselskoye Rural Settlement, Kovrovsky District, Vladimir Oblast, Russia. The population was 17 as of 2010.

Geography 
Medyntsevo is located 19 km southwest of Kovrov (the district's administrative centre) by road. Velikovo is the nearest rural locality.

References 

Rural localities in Kovrovsky District